O'Vonte Mullings (born October 9, 2000) is a Canadian soccer player who currently plays as a fullback for USL Championship side New York Red Bulls II.

Career

Youth
Mullings attended high school at Northview Heights Secondary School in Toronto, whilst playing club soccer for the FC Durham Academy. In his first eight matches of the Ontario Academy Soccer League 2018 season, Mullings scored 11 goals for FC Durham.

College & Amateur
In 2018, Mullings attended Florida Gulf Coast University to play college soccer. In four years with the Eagles, Mullings made 57 appearances, scoring 28 goals and tallying seven assists. As a freshman, Mullings was named ASUN Freshman of the Year, All ASUN-Freshman Team, and to the Second-Team All-Atlantic Region. He was named the ASUN Player of the Year for the 2021 spring season, along with making the ASUN First Team and All-Tournament Team. Mullings was also was a unanimous selection to the conference's First Team in 2019.

In 2019, Mullings also played in the USL League Two with Seattle Sounders FC U-23. He made nine appearances, scoring three goals and adding one assist to his name.

Professional
On January 11, 2022, Mullings was selected 20th overall in the 2022 MLS SuperDraft by New York Red Bulls. Red Bulls traded $75,000 in General Allocation Money and their second round draft pick to Seattle Sounders FC to acquire the 20th pick. On March 4, 2022, Mullings signed with USL Championship side New York Red Bulls II. He made his professional debut on March 16, 2022, starting in a 1–0 win over Atlanta United 2.  On August 9, 2022, Mullings scored the winning goal for New York in a 2-1 victory over Atlanta United 2.

References

External links

2000 births
Living people
Association football forwards
Canadian soccer players
Canadian expatriate soccer players
Canadian expatriate sportspeople in the United States
College men's soccer players in the United States
Expatriate soccer players in the United States
Florida Gulf Coast Eagles men's soccer players
New York Red Bulls draft picks
New York Red Bulls II players
Seattle Sounders FC U-23 players
Soccer players from Toronto
USL Championship players
USL League Two players